The Daily Ledger is an American daily newspaper published Monday through Friday mornings, and Saturday mornings, in Canton, Illinois. It is owned by Gannett.

The Ledger also publishes a free shopper publication, The Fulton County Shopper. Both the shopper and the daily circulate throughout Fulton County, Illinois.

The Ledger name dates to 1850, when The Illinois Public Ledger, a weekly newspaper, was founded in Lewistown, Illinois, the Fulton County seat; it moved to Canton in 1854, under the name Fulton Ledger. It adopted a daily publication schedule, as the Canton Daily Ledger, October 3, 1912, and absorbed the Canton Daily Register in 1926; the combined paper was known as the Canton Daily Ledger and Daily Register until 1961.

In 1987, the paper was acquired by Hollinger. Former owner GateHouse Media purchased roughly 160 daily and weekly newspapers from Hollinger in 1997.

References

External links 
 
 List of institutions that own print and microfilm of this newspaper found at the Illinois Newspaper Project

Gannett publications
Newspapers published in Illinois
Fulton County, Illinois
Publications established in 1850